The Diapason is a magazine serving those who build and play organs.  Content includes concert and recital announcements, information on building and maintaining organs and profiles of notable organists.

As of July 2013, The Diapason reaches about 5,000 subscribers. Until December 1967, it billed itself as the official journal of the American Guild of Organists and the Royal Canadian College of Organists.

History and profile
The magazine was founded in 1909 by Siegfried E. Gruenstein, who also served as its first editor. Its first publication date was December 1, 1909. It is currently owned and published by Scranton Gillette Communications.

References

External links
 Official website
Scranton Gillette Communications, Inc. - Website

Business magazines published in the United States
Magazines established in 1909
Magazines published in Chicago
Professional and trade magazines